The 1988 World Junior Curling Championships were held from March 13 to 19 in Füssen, West Germany for the men's competition and from March 19 to 25 in Chamonix, France for the women's competition. While it was the 14th junior men's competition, this was the inaugural year for the junior women's competition. It has also been the only year that the men's and women's competitions were held separately.

The men's event (sponsored by Uniroyal) was won by Canada, skipped by Jim Sullivan and his rink from Fredericton, New Brunswick.

The women's event was won also won by Canada, skipped by University of Victoria student Julie Sutton's Kelowna, British Columbia rink.

Men

Teams

Round Robin Standings

Playoffs

Gold medal final

Bronze medal final

All Stars
Skip:  Jim Sullivan
Third:  Charlie Sullivan
Second:  Craig Burgess
Lead:  Peter Hostettler

Additionally, Derek Brown of Scotland won the sportsmanship award.

Women

Teams

Round Robin Standings

Tiebreaker

Playoffs

Gold medal final

Bronze medal final

References

External links

J
World Junior Curling Championships
Sport in Füssen
Sport in Chamonix
International curling competitions hosted by Germany
International sports competitions hosted by West Germany
International curling competitions hosted by France
March 1988 sports events in Europe
1988 in youth sport
1988 in West German sport
1988 in French sport